John Morrow (birth and death dates unknown) was a U.S. Representative from Virginia.

Morrow was elected as a Democratic-Republican to the Ninth and Tenth Congresses (March 4, 1805 – March 3, 1809).

Electoral history

1805; Morrow was elected to the U.S. House of Representatives with 50.83% defeating Federalist James Stephenson.
1807; Morrow was re-elected unopposed.
1809; Morrow was defeated by Federalist Stephenson.

Sources

Year of birth unknown
Year of death unknown
Democratic-Republican Party members of the United States House of Representatives from Virginia